The IZh-81 (ИЖ-81) is a Russian pump-action shotgun.

History 

In 1990s and even in year 2000 IZh-81 was the most common shotgun in private security companies in Russia.

In 1997, work began on creating a semi-automatic shotgun based on the design of IZh-81. In 1998, first MP-151 shotgun was made. After tests and trials, in 1999 this shotgun was presented at the "IWA-99" arms exhibition in Nuremberg. However, only 100 MP-151 were made before its production was discontinued.

In year 2000 began serial production of new pump-action shotgun MP-133 (based on IZh-81M design) and new self-loading shotgun MP-153 (based on MP-133 design) was presented in Moscow arms exhibition. And in year 2000, production of IZh-81 was discontinued.

In April 2000, the price of one standard IZh-81 was between 4400 and 5400 rubles.

Design 
IZh-81 is a smoothbore shotgun. 

It has a beech stock and fore-end.

Variants 
 IZh-81 (ИЖ-81) — standard version with 700mm barrel and fixed wooden stock, it has four round tubular magazine (12/70mm shells)
 IZh-81M (ИЖ-81M) — IZh-81 version (12/76mm Magnum shells)
 IZh-81 «Jaguar» (ИЖ-81 «Ягуар») — IZh-81 version for private security guards, it has 560mm barrel and wooden pistol grip without stock
 IZh-81 «Fox Terrier» (ИЖ-81 «Фокстерьер») — IZh-81 version for private security guards, it has 600mm barrel, AK-74M glass-filled polyamide folding stock and pistol grip
 IZh-81K (ИЖ-81К) — second model with 700mm barrel and fixed wooden stock, it has four round detachable box magazine (12/70mm shells)
 IZh-81KM (ИЖ-81КM) — IZh-81K version (12/76mm Magnum shells)

 MP-151 (Mechanical Plant-151) - semi-automatic shotgun based on IZh-81 design

Users 

  - IZh-81K shotguns were sold to Bangladesh Police
  - IZh-81 and IZh-81K are allowed as civilian hunting weapon
  - IZh-81 is officially adopted by Bosnian police
  - IZh-81 is officially adopted by the customs service
  - IZh-81 is allowed as civilian hunting weapon. Also, it was allowed as service weapon in private security companies until March 1, 2006

References

Sources 
 Михаил Драгунов. Магазинное гладкоствольное ружьё ИЖ-81 // журнал "Мастер-ружьё", № 7/8, 1996. стр.16-26
 В. Н. Трофимов. Отечественные охотничьи ружья гладкоствольные. М., ДАИРС, 2000. стр.85-93

External links
 M. R. Popenker. IZh-81 IZh-81K IZh-81KM pump action shotgun (Russia) / "Modern Firearms"
 Baikal IZH-81 / Internet Movie Firearms Database

Pump-action shotguns
Shotguns of Russia
Izhevsk Mechanical Plant products
Weapons and ammunition introduced in 1993